Pierre Cally (25 September 1630 – 31 December 1709) was a French Catholic Cartesian philosopher and theologian.

Life
He was born at Mesnil-Hubert near Argentan, now Orne, France. In 1660 he was appointed professor of philosophy and eloquence in the University of Caen, and in 1675, president of the Collège des Arts in the same city. In 1684 he assumed charge of the parish of Saint-Martin. He was an associate of Pierre Daniel Huet, who converted him to Cartesianism, and Jean Renaud de Segrais. Cally died 31 December 1709.

Works
He wrote a course of philosophy, Universæ philosophiæ institutiones (Caen, 1695), in which the theories of Descartes are explained and defended. He worked for the conversion of Protestants, and gave conferences in which he endeavoured to solve their difficulties. For the same purpose, and in reply to the Jesuit Louis Le Valois, he composed a book on the Eucharist, Durand commenté, ou accord de la philosophie avec la théologie touchant la transsubstantiation de l'eucharistie (Caen, 1700). In it he denies the existence of absolute accidents and, instead of transubstantiation, admits a transformation. Before and after the consecration the matter of the bread remains the same; by the consecration the matter of the bread becomes the matter of the body of Christ. A publisher in Caen was asked to print sixty copies of the work to be sent to competent judges before making it public. In fact, eight hundred copies were printed immediately and sold. At once the book became the subject of many discussions, and was bitterly denounced. On 30 March 1701, François de Nesmond, bishop of Bayeux condemned seventeen propositions taken from Cally's work as leading to heresy concerning transubstantiation. Cally made a public retraction on 21 April of the same year.

He also wrote

 "Doctrine hérétique et schismatique touchant la primauté du pape enseignée par les jésuites dans leur collége de Caen" (1644); 
 "Discours en forme d'homélies sur les mystères, sur les miracles et sur les paroles de Notre-Seigneur Jésus-Christ qui sont dans l'évangile" (Caen, 1703),

and published a new edition with commentaries of Boethius's work, De consolatione philosophiae (Caen, 1695).

Notes

References
Attribution
 The entry cites:
Picot, Mémoires pour servir à l'histoire eclésiastique pendant le 18e siècle (3d ed., Paris, 1853), I, 229;
Werner, Der Heilige Thomas von Aquino (Ratisbon, 1889), III, 555; Mangenot in Dict. de théol. cath., II, 1368.

Further reading

Lodi Nauta, Platonic and Cartesian philosophy in the commentary on Boethius' consolatio philosophiae by Pierre Cally, British Journal for the History of Philosophy, Volume 4, Issue 1 March 1996, pages 79 – 100. Online PDF
Giuliano Gasparri, Pierre Cally (1630–1709) comme source du Lexicon rationale (1692) d’Étienne Chauvin, Il Seicento e Descartes (2004), pp. 255–268.

External links
Biography from 1812

1630 births
1709 deaths
French philosophers
17th-century French Catholic theologians
French male non-fiction writers
17th-century French male writers